The Museum of Navarra is the art museum of Navarre, and is located on Calle Cuesta Santo Domingo in Pamplona, in the Navarre province of Spain.

History
The museum is sited in the old hospital of 16th-century Nuestra Señora de la Misericordia de Pamplona, converted to museum only in 1956. The origins of the collection are works obtained by a provincial Commission in 1844, and displayed in 1910 at what is now the Cámara de los Comptos. To the right of the entrance is the facade of the church of the hospital.

The exhibits in the four story museum is chronologically arranged, starting from prehistoric works to the 20th-century. Among its collections are:
The “Mapa de Abauntz”, a prehistoric engraving on a block with geographic signs
Triumph of Bacchus first-century mosaic from the Ancient Roman town of Andelos, near Mendigorría
Romanesque capitals of the ancient cathedral of Pamplona
The Leyre Casket, an ivory Mozarabic chest (1004/5)
Romanesque murals from San Martín in Artaíz
Romanesque murals from belfry of San Pedro de Olite
Murals from San Saturnino in Artajona
Gothic Murals (1330) from the Refectory of the Cathedral of Pamplona by 
Murals from Gallipienzo and Olleta
Grisaille Renaissance Murals from the Palacio de Óriz depicting the War in Saxony of Charles V
Statue of San Jerónimo by Juan de Anchieta
Ecce Homo attributed to Luis de Morales
Paintings by Vicente Berdusán
Coronation of the Virgin by Francisco Camilo
Annunciation by Francisco de Lizona
San José by Alonso del Arco
Immaculate Conception by Francisco Ignacio Ruiz de la Iglesia 
Still-life with Fish by school of Mateo Cerezo
Story of Genesis (1700), twelve paintings on copper by the Flemish Jacob Bouttats,
Portrait of Leandro Fernández de Moratín (c. 1790) painted by Luis Paret 
Portrait of the Marquis of San Adrián by Goya

In addition the museum displays works by artists from or active in Navarre such as Javier Ciga, Jesús Basiano, Gerardo Sacristán, Caro, Joreg Oteiza, Julio Martín Royo, Salaberri, Aquerreta or Manterola. The church is used to display retablos and religious art.

References

Art museums and galleries in Spain
Buildings and structures in Pamplona
Art museums established in 1956
Museums in Navarre